Opostega melitardis is a moth of the family Opostegidae. It was described by Edward Meyrick in 1918. It is known from Natal, South Africa.

References

Endemic moths of South Africa
Opostegidae
Moths of Africa
Moths described in 1918